Dr. Dimensionpants is a Canadian animated television series created by Brad Peyton and produced by DHX Media and The Factory Backwards Entertainment. Originally set to launch in the winter of 2014 on Teletoon, the series instead premiered on November 6, 2014, as well as on Télétoon. 26 episodes were produced.

Plot
Kyle Lipton was a normal 12-year-old kid, until a portal opened and dropped a pair of "The Dimensionpants", also called the 'Pants of Power' or 'Power Pants'. It is one of several powerful clothing items constructed in the Unicrone dimension, which also included socks and a summer dress. When he wears them, he becomes a new superhero called Dr. Dimensionpants. Now Kyle has all the superhero powers he ever wanted, along with responsibility. With the help of a talking unicorn named Philip, Dr. Dimensionpants learns his powers to save the dimensions, while dealing with normal kid issues.

Characters
Philiponius ("Philip") Chickpea (voiced by Richard Ian Cox) is Kyle's unicorn mentor and occasional sidekick. Prior to Kyle he had taught 37 others to serve in the role of Dr. Dimensionalpants, and is able to restrict access to their powers.

Lipton family
Kyle Bradley Lipton (voiced by Samuel Vincent) is a 12-year-old boy who is the latest to adopt the secret identity of Dr. Dimensionpants.
Amanda Lipton (voiced by Kazumi Evans) is Kyle's younger sister who is a genius and has a blog on the web.
Ann-Mary Lipton (voiced by Kathleen Barr) is the mother of Amanda and Kyle.
Dunley Lipton (voiced by Brian Drummond) is the father of Amanda and Kyle. He would like to spend everyday only with his son, but Kyle is always busy with his superhero duties. Dunley loves Kyle very much, and so he does him.

School
Liz Business (voiced by Kathleen Barr) is a barbell-lifting brunette with a scar across her eye. She secretly loves Kyle.
Rebecca Stella (voiced by Shannon Chan-Kent) is a popular blonde that Kyle moons over who turns out to be the daughter of Glass Skull.
Mr. Silverstein (voiced by Samuel Vincent) is Kyle's teacher.
Dutch (voiced by Brian Drummond) is a recurring school bully. His dad is named Butch.
Lennon (voiced by Andrew Francis) is the boy Rebecca likes.
Dragon Master Paul is Kyle's blonde friend who likes roleplaying.

Villains
Head-themed:
The Cortex (voiced by Ian James Corlett) is one of Kyle's nemeses with hydrocephalia and a stickler for people calling him The Cortex. The Cortex seeks to steal the Dimensionpants so he can become all powerful. Corlett also voices Motho Jr.
Glass Skull (voiced by Brian Drummond) is another nemesis whom, as his name suggests, has a glass skull. He desires the Dimensionpants like The Cortex. Drummond also voices Dutch's dad Butch. He is the father of Rebecca Stella.

Roblins:
Glug (voiced by Brian Drummond, who also does Merman #1)
Slob (voiced by Noel Johansen, who also does Merman #2)

Wizards:
Evil Wizard Murray (voiced by Trevor Devall) is Silas' brother.
Evil Wizard Silas (voiced by Brian Dobson) is Murray's brother.

Others:
Goody Gobbles is a human-eating turkey.
Thora (voiced by Cathy Weseluck) is a Viking girl who hunts unicorns. She returns in "Viking Games" after debuting in an episode where she interrupts a party of fake unicorns.
Underwater Man (voiced by Gabe Khouth, who also does Underwater Dad)
Motho (voiced by Peter Kelamis, who also does Alien Referee)
 Destructocorn
 Wrongo Bongo

Broadcast
Dr. Dimensionpants first premiered on Cartoon Network international channels in Poland on October 20, in Germany, the Benelux on October 27, 2014 and Latin America on June 3, 2015. The series has been sold to ABC in Australia. It premiered on Hulu on June 13, 2015 in the US. It premiered on Kix on July 23, 2016 in the UK.

Episodes

Series overview

Season 1 (2014–15)

Season 2 (2015)

Notes

Games
Web games that Teletoon made based on the show include:
FLYIN'
Power Pants Panic

References

External links
 

2010s Canadian animated television series
2014 Canadian television series debuts
2015 Canadian television series endings
Canadian children's animated action television series
Canadian children's animated adventure television series
Canadian children's animated comedy television series
Canadian children's animated superhero television series
Canadian flash animated television series
English-language television shows
Teletoon original programming
Television series by DHX Media
Animated television series about children
Fiction about unicorns
Television series about parallel universes